Valdimar Briem (1 February 1848 - 3 May 1930) was an Icelandic poet, prelate, hymnwriter and translator. He served as the first Suffragan Bishop of Skálholt from 1909 till 1930.

Biography
Briem was born at Grund in Eyjafjörður. His father was Olafur Briem a farmer and carpenter at Grund and his mother was Dómhildur Þorsteinsdóttir. After the death of his parents, he was raised by his uncle in Hruna. He attended the Theological Seminary in Reykjavik and graduated in theology on 21 February 1873. He was ordained priest on 27 April 1873, after which he served as pastor of Hrepphólar in Hrunamannahreppur. Between 1880 and 1909 he became pastor of the Stóri-Núpur parish. He was a Dean of Árnesprófastsdæmi between 1896 and 1918. After the Diocese of Skálholt was re-established in 1909 as a suffragan see, he was appointed as its first bishop on 27 December 1909. He retained the post till his death.

He was a notable hymnwriter and translator, and he wrote around 80 hymns in the hymn book of the Church of Iceland. Ten of his hymns are also included in the hymn book of the Church of the Faroe Islands. A number of his hymns were also translated into English.

References 

1848 births
1930 deaths
Valdimar Briem
20th-century Lutheran bishops
20th-century Icelandic poets
19th-century Icelandic poets
Icelandic male poets
Icelandic translators
Icelandic Lutheran hymnwriters